Ordo Ad Chao is the fourth full-length album by the Norwegian black metal band Mayhem. The album received the Spellemann Award for best heavy metal album on 2 February 2008.

Background

Ordo Ad Chao is the first album to feature vocalist Attila Csihar since the 1994 debut De Mysteriis Dom Sathanas and the last with Blasphemer before he announced his departure from the band in 2008.

Drummer Hellhammer said that the drum tracks were not equalized and only the bass drums were triggered. He concluded "the production sounds necro as fuck, but that's the way we wanted it – this time. It represents Mayhem today." Indeed, the sound of the album is much rawer than that of any official Mayhem studio release since Deathcrush, with a very bass-heavy mix. Despite that, the album continues the somewhat unorthodox songwriting approach showcased on the band's last two releases, with "Illuminate Eliminate" being the band's second longest song. Despite being a black metal album, it has some death metal influences including the use of death grunt vocals.

It also has the distinction of being the first Mayhem album with lyrics written by Attila Csihar. Consequently, there is a thematic shift from the band's earlier lyrics, which focused mostly on morbid and Satanic ideas, and the lyrics here allude to psychic powers, the Annunaki, and the creation of the human race as a workforce for alien powers.

Ordo Ad Chao was released on 23 April 2007. It charted at #12 in Norway, making it the band's highest-charting album yet. There is a version of the album supplied in a metal case that is limited to a production of 3,000.

Track listing

Personnel
Mayhem
Attila Csihar – vocals, producer, mastering
Blasphemer – guitar, bass guitar, backing vocals
Hellhammer – drums
Necrobutcher – bass guitar

Additional personnel
Knut Valle – engineer, mixing
Kim Sølve, Trine Paulsen – artwork, photography

Charts

References

2007 albums
Mayhem (band) albums
Season of Mist albums